Mary Horner Lyell (9 October 1808 – 24 April 1873) was a conchologist and geologist. She was married to the famed British geologist Charles Lyell and assisted him in his scientific work. She never became widely known in her own right, although it is believed by historians that she likely made major contributions to her husband's work.

Biography
Mary Elizabeth Horner was born in London in 1808. She was the eldest of six daughters of Leonard Horner, a professor of geology and educational reformer who taught in England and Germany and was also President of The Geological Society of London in 1846 and 1860. Leonard Horner was eager for all his children to be well educated. Mary became a conchologist and geologist while her younger sister Katharine became a botanist.

In 1832, aged 23, she married Charles Lyell (1787-1875), who was previously taught geology by her father. With her husband, she shared not only her love of geology but also a love of literature and friendship connections in the world of literature. Mary's sister Katherine married Charles Lyell's younger brother, Henry.

She died in 1873 while residing in London, just two years before the death of her husband.

Career
Horner Lyell is most well known for her scientific work in 1854, where she studied her collection of land snails from the Canary Islands.  This study was comparable to Charles Darwin's study on birds and tortoises on the Galapagos Islands.

Mary and Charles were scientific partners; she accompanied him on field trips and assisted him by sketching geological drawings, packing their clothes, equipment and specimens, cataloguing their collections, learning Spanish and Swedish in addition to her spoken languages of French and German in order to assist with communications, and acting as a scribe when his eyesight failed in later years. Mary was a significant contributor to the famous book by her husband, "Principles of Geology".

The geologist Roderick Murchison noted her attendance at special meetings of the London Geological Society and it is clear that she had a keen interest and a thorough understanding of geology.  She corresponded in writing with Elizabeth Agassiz about the glacial geology of South America.  Horner Lyell also corresponded with William Prescott.  She was present in her husband's conversations with Charles Darwin, later assisting him by sourcing barnacles, which he acknowledged with a letter in which he also discussed the geology of Scottish glens. Mary was praised by Charles Darwin and described as "a monument of patience" when collaborating with Darwin and her husband.

Honours
A crater on the planet Venus was named Horner in her honour, see List of craters on Venus.

References

1808 births
1873 deaths
19th-century British geologists
People from St Pancras, London
19th-century British women scientists
Conchologists
Burials at Brookwood Cemetery
English women geologists